Lee Mee-hyun  (born 25 October 1994) is a South Korean freestyle skier who competes internationally.
 
She competed in the World Championships 2017, and participated at the 2018 Winter Olympics. She finished in 13th place in a controversial call by the judges that kept her from qualifying for the finals.

References

External links

1994 births
Living people
South Korean female freestyle skiers 
Olympic freestyle skiers of South Korea 
Freestyle skiers at the 2018 Winter Olympics